W-SIM (Willcom-SIM) is a SIM card developed by Willcom which, in addition to standard SIM functions, also has the core components of a cellular telephone (PHS), such as the radio receiver/transmitter, built inside. It is currently used in some terminals (listed below), which do not have radio modules.

The W-SIM core module is an extended version of a SIM card, containing not only user data but also all the transmission technology needed for a mobile device to work.

A terminal device developer can build a customized terminal without the design and development of a radio module, and users can change to a different radio module W-SIM without changing the terminal itself.

Similar to traditional handsets made by WILLCOM, W-SIM terminals can be used in Japan, including global roaming with Taiwan and Thailand. For Mainland China, China Netcom had W-SIMs available, though its PHS network is due to be phased out this year. In addition, a GSM version called the CM-G100 had been developed for use in other countries.

WILLCOM branded terminals
WS001IN / "TT"
Hand-set terminal by Net Index.
WS002IN / "DD" 
Data communication terminal by Net Index.
WS003SH / W-ZERO3
Hand-set terminal(smartphone) by Sharp.
WS004SH / W-ZERO3
Hand-set terminal(smartphone) by Sharp. Higher-spec version of WS003SH.
WS005IN / nico.
Hand-set terminal by Net Index.
WS007SH / W-ZERO3 [es]
Hand-set terminal(smartphone) by Sharp. Stylish and slender version of W-ZERO3.
WS008HA / WS008HA
ExpressCard data communication terminal by Hagiwara Sys-Com.
WS009KE / 9(nine)
Hand-set terminal by KES.

Terminals branded by other than WILLCOM
Kids Ke-tai !
Hand-set terminal by Bandai. The internal code is WS006.

External links
 Willcom Inc.'s page
  Engadget entry
 TT Phone
 DD "Data Driver"
 Sharp W-Zero3 PDA phone

Mobile technology